Rodney K. Harrison (born February 25, 1969) is an American police officer and administrator and currently serves as Commissioner of the Suffolk County Police Department. He also previously served as the Chief of Department of the NYPD. During his career as a police officer, Harrison has held other senior ranks in New York Police Department as well, such the NYPD's chief executive officer for Staten Island, Chief of Patrol and Chief of Detectives. On December 21, 2021 it was announced that Harrison would become the next Police Commissioner for the Suffolk County Police Department. After his nomination was approved by the Suffolk County legislature, Harrison became the first black commissioner in the department's history.

Early life
Harrison grew up in the South Jamaica section of Queens and joined the NYPD in 1991 as a police cadet. Harrison was sworn in as a police officer with the June 30, 1992 midnight class. The purpose of having that class sworn in one second into July 1 was because the NYC budget goes from July 1 to June 30. Harrison graduated from the NYC Police Academy on January 12, 1993. After graduating, he began patrolling in Astoria, Queens in 1994. He was promoted to detective in 1995, including internal affairs before worked in various detective commands in Brooklyn. He was Chief of Patrol before being promoted to Chief of Detectives.

Career

Suffolk County Police Department
In December 2021 Suffolk County Executive Steve Bellone had nominated Harrison to be the county's police commissioner. Harrison retired from the NYPD after a 30-year career as a result. On December 23, 2021, Suffolk County's legislature unanimously confirmed Harrison's nomination and thus cleared the path for his appointment. Harrison was sworn in as the Commissioner of the Suffolk County Police Department on Tuesday, January 11, 2022.

New York City Police Department

In December 2019 Harrison was promoted to the position of the chief of detectives – the first black person to hold the role since the force's founding 200 years prior.

Dates of Rank
Sworn in as a Patrolman - 07/01/1992 Promoted to Detective - 1995   Promoted to Sergeant - 1996  Promoted to Lieutenant - 2002  Promoted to Captain - 2007  Promoted to Deputy Inspector - 2011  Promoted to Inspector - 2013  Promoted to Deputy Chief - 2016  Promoted to Chief of Patrol - 2018 Promoted to Chief of Detectives - 2019 Chief of Department - 2021

References

New York City Police Department officers
African-American police officers
Living people
1969 births